Pectinodonta is a genus of sea snails, the true limpets, marine gastropod mollusks in the family Pectinodontidae.

Species
Species within the genus Pectinodonta include:
 Pectinodonta alis B. A. Marshall, Puillandre, Lambourdière, Couloux & Samadi, 2016
 Pectinodonta alpha B. A. Marshall, Puillandre, Lambourdière, Couloux & Samadi, 2016
 Pectinodonta alta Schepman, 1908
 Pectinodonta arcuata Dall, 1882
 Pectinodonta aupouria B. A. Marshall, 1985
 Pectinodonta aurora B. A. Marshall, Puillandre, Lambourdière, Couloux & Samadi, 2016
 Pectinodonta beta B. A. Marshall, Puillandre, Lambourdière, Couloux & Samadi, 2016
 Pectinodonta borealis Kaim, Hryniewic, C. Little & Nakrem, 2017 †
 † Pectinodonta coniformis (Marwick, 1931) 
 Pectinodonta gamma B. A. Marshall, Puillandre, Lambourdière, Couloux & Samadi, 2016
 Pectinodonta gilbertvossi Olsson, 1971
 † Pectinodonta kapalae B. A. Marshall, 1985
 Pectinodonta komitica B. A. Marshall, 1985 
 Pectinodonta marinovichi Marshall, 1998
 Pectinodonta maxima (Dautzenberg, 1925)
 Pectinodonta mazuae S.-Q. Zhang & S.-P. Zhang, 2018
 Pectinodonta morioria B. A. Marshall, 1985
 Pectinodonta obtusa (Thiele, 1925)
 Pectinodonta orientalis Schepman, 1908
 † Pectinodonta palaeoxylodia Lindberg & Hedegaard, 1996
 Pectinodonta philippinarum B. A. Marshall, Puillandre, Lambourdière, Couloux & Samadi, 2016
 Pectinodonta rhyssa (Dall, 1925)
 † Pectinodonta waitemata B. A. Marshall, 1985

References

 Marshall, B. A.; Puillandre, N.; Lambourdiere, J.; Couloux, A.; Samadi, S. (2016). Deep-sea wood-eating limpets of the genus Pectinodonta Dall, 1882 (Mollusca: Gastropoda: Patellogastropoda: Pectinodontidae) from the tropical West Pacific. In: V. Héros et al. (eds), Tropical Deep-Sea Benthos 29. Mémoires du Muséum national d'Histoire naturelle. 208: 23

External links
 Dall, W. H. (1882). On certain limpets and chitons from the deep waters off the eastern coast of the United States. Proceedings of the United States National Museum. 4: 400-414.
 Marshall, B. A. (1985). Recent and Tertiary deep-sea limpets of the genus Pectinodonta Dall (Mollusca: Gastropoda) from New Zealand and New South Wales. New Zealand Journal of Zoology. 12 (2): 273-282

Pectinodontidae